Trigger Happy! is the sole album led by American jazz double bassist Trigger Alpert which was recorded in 1956 for the Riverside label. The album was also issued under Zoot Sims Al Cohn and Tony Scott's names as East Coast Sounds.

Reception
Allmusic awarded the East Coast Sounds album 4 stars with Ken Dryden stating "Zoot Sims and Al Cohn made many records together in small-group settings, but this isn't one of their better-known dates, though it is a rewarding one... Recommended". The British Gramophone magazine's review from 1958 called it "a session that presents first-class soloists within settings that are witty as well as intelligent. The mood is gay rather than profound, the approach formal and not at all intense".

Track listing
 "Treat Me Rough" (George Gershwin, Ira Gershwin) - 2:50  
 "Looking at You" (Cole Porter) - 4:20  
 "Love Me Tomorrow (But Leave Me Alone Today)" (Vernon Duke, John La Touche) - 4:51  
 "Trigger Happy" (Tony Scott) - 2:28  
 "Tranquilizer" (Dick Hyman) - 4:28  
 "I Like the Likes of You" (Duke, Yip Harburg) - 4:08  
 "I Wish I Were in Love Again" (Lorenz Hart, Richard Rodgers) - 3:35  
 "I Don't Want to Be Alone Again" (Johnny Mercer, Jimmie Smith) - 3:28  
 "Trigger Fantasy"(Trigger Alpert) - 5:24  
 "Where's That Rainbow?" (Hart, Rodgers) - 3:35  
Recorded at Reeves Sound Studios in New York City October 29, 1956 (tracks 1-3), November 23, 1956 (tracks 4-6) and November 30, 1956 (tracks 7-10)

Personnel 
Trigger Alpert - bass
Joe Wilder - trumpet
Urbie Green - trombone
Tony Scott - clarinet, tenor saxophone, arranger 
Zoot Sims - tenor saxophone, alto saxophone
Al Cohn - tenor saxophone, baritone saxophone 
Ed Shaughnessy - drums
Dick Hyman, Marty Paich - arranger

References 

1956 albums
Zoot Sims albums
Al Cohn albums
Albums produced by Orrin Keepnews
Riverside Records albums
Albums arranged by Dick Hyman
Albums arranged by Marty Paich
Tony Scott (musician) albums